Sarah (Arabic: سارة) is a Lebanese soap opera starring Cyrine Abdelnour, Youssef El Khal and Youssef Haddad. It covers the life of a Lebanese woman.

Episodes
Season one aired 15 episodes from October 19, 2008, to January 26, 2009. Season two debuted on February 23, 2009.

Cast
Cyrine Abdelnour 
youssef el khal
youssef haddad
pamela el kik
majdi machmouchi
Nada abou farhat
joelle frenn
Imad Feghaly
anne marie salemeh
layla kamari
wadad jabbour
janah fakhoury
Mona Karim
Muhammad Ibrahim

International Release

References

External links

2000s Lebanese television series
2010s Lebanese television series
2009 Lebanese television series debuts
2010 Lebanese television series endings
Lebanese television series
Lebanese television soap operas
MTV (Lebanon) original programming